Patrick Sean Smith is an American television show creator, writer, and producer.

Filmography

The Chronicle (2002) writer
Everwood (2003-2004) writer
Summerland (2005) writer
Supernatural (2006) writer
Greek (2007–2011) creator, writer, producer
Chasing Life (2014–2015) writer, producer
Dolly Parton's Heartstrings (2019) writer

References

External links 
 

American male screenwriters
American television producers
American television writers
Living people
Showrunners
LGBT television producers
American LGBT screenwriters
American male television writers
Year of birth missing (living people)